Murat Reis the Elder (1534 – 1609) was an Ottoman privateer and admiral, who served in the Ottoman Navy. He is regarded as one of the most important Barbary corsairs.

Early career 
Born into an Albanian family on Rhodes in 1534 he began his career when he joined the crew of Turgut Reis at a very young age. He also fought alongside Piri Reis in several expeditions. In 1534 Murat Reis accompanied Hayreddin Barbarossa Pasha to Constantinople where they were received by Suleiman I and appointed to take command of the Ottoman fleet. While in Constantinople, Murat Reis participated in the construction of new warships at the naval arsenal on the Golden Horn.

Battle of Preveza 

Murat Reis took part in all of the early naval campaigns of Turgut Reis. On September 25 and 26, 1538, he was assigned with the task of preventing the ships of the Holy League under the command of Andrea Doria from landing at Preveza, and he successfully repulsed them from the shoreline. On September 28, he took part in the main combat and played an important role in the Ottoman victory at the Battle of Preveza, where he fought along with Turgut Reis in the center-rear wing of the Ottoman fleet which had a Y-shaped battle configuration. He continued to accompany Turgut Reis until being assigned as the Commander-in-Chief of the Indian Ocean fleet.

Siege and conquest of Cyprus 
In 1570 Murat Reis, in command of a fleet of 25 galleys, was assigned with the task of clearing the area between Crete, Rhodes and Cyprus for the build-up of the naval siege and eventual conquest of Cyprus. He was also assigned with the task of blocking the Venetian ships based in Crete from sailing to Cyprus and assisting the Venetian forces in that island. He continued to undertake this task until the eventual surrender of Famagusta, the final Venetian stronghold on the island.

Canary Islands 
In 1585 he led the first expedition of the Barbary corsairs in the Atlantic Ocean and captured several of the Canary Islands. During the attacks, among others he captured the Spanish governor of Lanzarote, who was later ransomed and released.

Mediterranean campaigns 
Murat Reis was later assigned with the task of controlling the lucrative trade routes between Egypt and Anatolia which were often raided by the Venetians, the French and the Maltese Knights. In 1609, he heard of the presence of a joint French-Maltese fleet of ten galleys, including the famous Galeona Rossa, a large galleon armed with 90 cannons which was known among the Ottomans as the Red Inferno, under the command of a knight named Fresine, off the island of Cyprus, and sailed there to engage them. After successfully striking the enemy ships with cannons from both long distance and close range, he severely damaged the Red Inferno and captured the ship. Six out of the ten French-Maltese galleys were captured, along with the 500 soldiers aboard, and the total of 160 cannons and 2000 muskets which they carried. During the battle Murat Reis was seriously injured. In 1609 he took part in the siege of Vlorë, during which he died.

Legacy 
Several submarines of the Turkish Navy have been named after Murat Reis (see Oruç Reis-class submarine). One of the municipalities that form the City of Algiers, which was once the regional capital of the Ottoman Eyalet of Algeria (1517–1830), is named Bir Mourad Raïs (Murat Reis' well) in his honor.

Under the name 'Morato Arráez, he is mentioned in several literary works of the Spanish Golden Age, for example by Miguel de Cervantes and Lope de Vega.

See also 
 Murat Reis the Younger
 Ottoman Navy

References and sources 

 E. Hamilton Currey, Sea-Wolves of the Mediterranean, London, 1910
 Bono, Salvatore: Corsari nel Mediterraneo (Corsairs in the Mediterranean), Oscar Storia Mondadori. Perugia, 1993.
 Corsari nel Mediterraneo: Condottieri di ventura. Online database in Italian, based on Salvatore Bono's book.
 Bradford, Ernle, The Sultan's Admiral: The life of Barbarossa, London, 1968.
 Wolf, John B., The Barbary Coast: Algeria under the Turks, New York, 1979; 
 The Ottomans: Comprehensive and detailed online chronology of Ottoman history in English.
 Comprehensive and detailed online chronology of Ottoman history  (in )
 Turkish Navy official website: Historic heritage of the Turkish Navy (in )

1534 births
1638 deaths
Piri Reis
Sailors from the Ottoman Empire
Ottoman Empire admirals
Naval history of the Ottoman Empire
People from Rhodes
Albanians from the Ottoman Empire
Ottoman Cyprus
16th century in Portugal
16th century in Spain
Ottoman Iraq
Ottoman Greece
16th-century people from the Ottoman Empire
17th-century people from the Ottoman Empire
16th-century Albanian people
17th-century Albanian people